The 2020 Hyderabad floods were a series of floods associated with Deep Depression BOB 02 that caused extensive damage and loss of life as a result of flash flooding in Hyderabad, India in October 2020. Among the most affected areas were Balapur, L. B. Nagar, parts of Old City such as Hafiz Baba Nagar, Al Jubail Colony, Omer colony, Osman Nagar, Nabeel Colony, Falaknuma, Chaderghat etc. The fourth tropical cyclone and third deep depression of the 2020 North Indian Ocean cyclone season, BOB 02 formed on 11 October over the west-central Bay of Bengal and slowly drifted towards the east coast of India over the following three days.

Weather systems 

On 11 October, an area of low pressure concentrated into a depression over the west-central Bay of Bengal. It further intensified into a deep depression on 12 October as it moved slowly west-northwestwards. After that, BOB 02 made landfall in Andhra Pradesh near Kakinada in the early hours of 13 October and weakened again into a depression. The system weakened into a well-marked low-pressure area over south-central Maharashtra on the evening of 14 October. Though the system's low-level circulation was partially exposed due to high vertical wind shear and continuous land interaction, the JTWC re-issued a tropical cyclone advisory on 15 October. The IMD also forecasted BOB 02 to reintensify in the Arabian Sea. The low-pressure area intensified into Depression ARB 03 in the early hours of 17 October. The system delayed the withdrawal of southwest monsoon season by almost a week.

Impact

The floodgates of the Himayat Sagar were lifted as the water reached full reservoir levels, and the Musi river flowed full stream, flooding several localities and flowing over two causeway bridges. Due to BOB 02, Puducherry, Andhra Pradesh, Telangana, Kerala, Maharashtra, and coastal Karnataka experienced heavy rain on 12 and 13 October with the capital city, with Hyderabad experiencing 32 cm of record breaking torrential rain creating flash floods on the city by 13 October. 2 people died in Vijayawada, and 50 people died on different parts of Telangana, including 19 in Hyderabad. Additionally, twenty seven people died in Maharashtra. Extreme crop loss in north Karnataka, Andhra Pradesh and Telangana occurred due to the system. The Chief Minister of Telangana estimated ₹5,000 crore (US$681 million) worth of damage. On 18 October, a second cyclone killed two more people in Hyderabad. Over 37,000 families were affected by the second flood. With over 80 people having lost their lives and about 40,000 families being displaced, post rain gathering up-to 20,000 tons of waste.

Aftermath 

360 National Disaster Response Force personnel, as well as Indian Army forces were deployed. The Telangana government requested the Central government to provide relief to Hyderabad and surrounding areas. Chief Minister K. Chandrashekhar Rao wrote a letter to Prime Minister Narendra Modi seeking immediate release of ₹1,350 crore, in which ₹600 crore for farmers and ₹750 crore on relief and rehabilitation works in the Greater Hyderabad Municipal Corporation area. On 14 October, the Telangana Government declared a two-day holiday for all nonessential workers due to flooding, and urged everyone to stay home. Amid the possibility of further flooding, more than 2,100 families were evacuated near Gurram Cheruvu. More than 150,000 meal packets were distributed to flood-affected areas. Furthermore, 60 teams were tasked with spreading bleach in cellars and open areas to prevent the spread of waterborne and vector-borne diseases.

See also 

 2020 North Indian Ocean cyclone season
 Great Musi Flood of 1908
 2000 Hyderabad floods
 2022 Bengaluru floods
 2019 Patna floods

References 

2020 disasters in India
2020 floods
October 2020 events in India
2020 North Indian Ocean cyclone season
2020 floods in Asia
Floods in India